Rubén Bareiro Saguier (January 22, 1930 – March 25, 2014) was a Paraguayan writer, poet and diplomat.

Early life 
Rubén Bareiro Saguier was born and grew up in Villeta, Paraguay. At the age of 11, he learned of the injustice of living in an authoritarian regime when the police, after looking for his father and failing to find him, took the young Rubén and imprisoned him in the town's police station.

In 1947, Bareiro Saguier received his school baccalaureate and began studying literature at the Universidad Nacional de Asunción. He stood out as a student leader, something which cost him further imprisonment. He received a bachelor's degree in literature in 1957. In 1962 he received a grant to study at the Universidad Paúl Valéry-Montpellier III, for which purpose he moved to France.

Career 
Bareiro Saguier began his literary career writing poems. In 1964 he published his first book, Biografía de ausente (Biography of an Absentee). In France, he worked as an assistant and Spanish teacher at the University of Paris, and then as a professor of Hispanic American literature and Guaraní language at the University of Vincennes. He was also part of the National Center of Scientific Investigation in Paris.

With the publication of Ojo por diente in 1971, he received the Cuban prize "Casa de las Américas". Because of this prize, the following year on one of his numerous visits to Paraguay he was arrested and locked up for a month and a half in the infamous Department of Investigations, at the center of the repression  under the regime of Alfredo Stroessner, accused of promoting "rebellious bustle". Immediately intellectuals from around the world mobilized to demand Bareiro Seguier's liberation, including individuals such as Jean-Paul Sartre, Gabriel García Márquez, Simone de Beauvoir and Fernando Savater. Finally, he was released and expelled from the country, sentenced to an exile which lasted until the fall of the dictatorship in 1989.

Later life and death 
Bareiro Saguier worked as ambassador for Paraguay in France from 1994 to 2003, when he returned to Paraguay.

He received Paraguay's National Prize for Literature in 2005.

He died in hospital in Asunción on March 25, 2014 after several months of poor health following a heart attack.

Honors and awards 
1950: First prize, Concurso de Cuentos – Revista Panorama, Asunción
1952: First prize, Concurso Ateneo Paraguayo, Asunción
1954: First prize, Concurso de Cuentos – Revista Panorama, Asunción
1970: Special mention, Concurso de poesía Latinoamericana – Revista Imagen Caracas
1972: Casa de las Américas Prize for his book Ojo de diente
2005: National Prize for Literature

Publications 
 Cuento y Novela, in collaboration with Manuel Arguello. Paraguay nation of métis.
 Biografía de ausente (1964), poetry with illustrations by Carlos Colombino
 Misa por un continente, with music by Francisco Marín, recorded by Barclay.
 Ojo por diente (1971), story. Pacte de sang (translation of “Ojo por diente” made by A. M. Metailié)
 A la víbora de la mar (1977), poetry with illustrations by Carlos Colombino. Second edition with introduction by Augusto Roa Bastos
 Literatura Guaraní del Paraguay (1980), essay, in collaboration with Jacqueline Baltran
 Antología Personal de Augusto Roa Bastos
 Cultura y Sociedad en América Latina
 Antología de la novela hispano-americana, in collaboration with Oliver de León
 Estancias, errancias, querencias (1985), poetry
 El séptimo pétalo del viento (1984), story with prologue and interview by Augusto Roa Bastos
  single story: Wie Onkel Emilio das ewige Leben erlangte. Transl. José Antonio Friedl Zapata. In: Ein neuer Name, ein fremdes Gesicht. 26 Erzählungen aus Lateinamerika. Luchterhand. Neuwied 1987, pp 212–228
 Las dictaduras en América Latina, introduction and announcement of slides
 Antología poética, selected by Daniel Leyva
 Augusto Roa Bastos: semana de autor (1986), essay
 Augusto Roa Bastos, caída y resurrecciones de un pueblo (1989), essay
 Antología de la poesía paraguaya del siglo XX (1990), anthology in collaboration with Carlos Villagra Marsal
 Antología de la novela latino-americana, in collaboration with Oliver de León
 De nuestras lenguas y otros discursos
 Tentaciónde la utopía - La República de los Jesuitas en el Paraguay, in collaboration with Jean Paul Duviels
 De la literature guaraní a la Literature paraguaya: Un proceso colonial, PhD thesis in literature, with Very Honorable mention
 La América hispánica en el siglo XX
 Cuentos de las dos orillas
 Antología poética (bilingual)
 De cómo el tío Emilio ganó la vida perdurable, monologues
 Antología de la poesía guaraní y en guaraní del Paraguay, in collaboration with Carlos Villagra Marsal
 Fiesta patronal, with photographs by Fernando Allen
 El río, la vida, with photographs by Fernando Allen

References 

1930 births
2014 deaths
People from Villeta
Paraguayan people of Galician descent
Paraguayan male writers
Paraguayan male poets